Mary Hood (c.1822–4 November 1902) was a New Zealand businesswoman within groceries, haberdashery and fancy goods. She was born in Martock, Somerset, England on c.1822. She took over the family business as a widow in 1866, after having assisted her husband for twenty years.

References

1822 births
1902 deaths
19th-century New Zealand businesswomen
19th-century New Zealand businesspeople
People from Somerset
English emigrants to New Zealand